Isa Aga (also called Vrtop or Van Korff) is a mountain peak in Kosovo and Macedonia. It is part of the Šar Mountains and is found in the middle of the ridge.

References

Mountains of Kosovo
Šar_Mountains